Your Jeweler's Showcase is an American television anthology drama series.  At least 21 episodes aired on CBS from November 11, 1952 to August 30, 1953. From January 6, 1953 to May 26, 1953 it alternated weekly with Demi-Tasse Tales.

Among its guest stars were Edith Evans, Chuck Connors, Celeste Holm, Ruth Warrick, George Nader, DeForest Kelley and Keye Luke.

Episodes

External links

Your Jeweler's Showcase at CVTA

1950s American anthology television series
1952 American television series debuts
1953 American television series endings
Black-and-white American television shows
CBS original programming